The ninth series of British talent competition programme Britain's Got Talent was broadcast on ITV, from 11 April to 31 May 2015. The series saw the "Wildcard" format introduced in the sixth series being modified in this series to include a "Public Wildcard" – like the "Judges' Wildcard" any act eliminated in the semi-finals, primarily those that lost out in the Judges' vote, could be reinstated by the public, based on the one that received the most votes from them before the final. Although speculations and rumours began to emerge after the previous series ended, claiming that some of the judges would be leaving before the ninth series, these were later dismissed as being unfounded by ITV, on 16 January 2015.

The ninth series was won by dog tricks duo Jules O'Dwyer & Matisse, with magician Jamie Raven finishing in second place, and Welsh choir Côr Glanaethwy placing third. During its broadcast, the series averaged around 9.9 million viewers. The ninth series saw the programme have to answer allegations of animal cruelty against a ventriloquist, while the producers caused controversy over the handling of O'Dwyer's performance in the final that Ofcom later ruled to have been misleading following complaints by viewers.

Series overview
Following open auditions held the previous year between October to December, the Judges' auditions took place between January and February 2015, within Edinburgh, Manchester, Birmingham and London. Unlike previous years, where a guest judge had to stand-in for another, no issues occurred that caused a member of the judging panel to be absent, while the auditions were held in a more standard manner for this year, though with the "Golden Buzzer" format remaining a part of them since its introduction to the show in the previous series.

Of the participants that took part, forty-five made it past this stage and into the five live semi-finals – of these acts, dance troupe Boyband, singer Calum Scott, choir Revelation Avenue, dance act Entity Allstars, and comedy singer Lorraine Bowen, each received a golden buzzer during their auditions – with nine appearing in each one. In a minor change to the show's "Wildcard act" format, the series saw the introduction of the "Public Wildcard". Like the "Judges' wildcard", if a semi-finalist was eliminated in their semi-final at the Judges' vote, they became eligible to be picked as a wildcard act by the public, who would vote on which one they would like to reinstate into the final once all the semi-finals had been aired, with their choice being the one to have received the most votes by the time the final was due to be aired. While the Public Wildcard was extreme martial artist Jesse-Jane McParland, who lost out in the tied Judges' vote in the final semi-final, the Judges' Wildcard for this series was dance troupe Boyband, who lost the Judges' vote in the fourth semi-final. As a result, it led to a total of twelve acts taking part in the series' final.

The following below lists the results of each participant's overall performance in this series:

 |  |  | 
 Judges' Wildcard Finalist |  Public Wildcard Finalist |  Golden Buzzer Audition

  Ages denoted for a participant(s), pertain to their final performance for this series.
  The age of the dogs used by Jules O'Dwyer, other than Matisse, and that of the dog used by Marc Metral, were not disclosed during their time on the programme.
  The latter value denotes the age of the dog, as disclosed by its owner.

Semi-finals summary
 Buzzed out |  Judges' vote | 
 |  |

Semi-final 1 (25 May)
Guest Performer, Results Show: Ricky Martin

Semi-final 2 (26 May)
Guest Performer, Results Show: Jack Pack

Semi-final 3 (27 May)
Guest Performer, Results Show: Alesha Dixon

Semi-final 4 (28 May)
Guest Performer, Results Show: Olly Murs

  Boyband were later sent through to the final as the judges' wildcard.

Semi-final 5 (29 May)
Guest performers, Results Show: Collabro

  Jesse-Jane McParland was later sent through to the final as the public's wildcard.

Final (31 May)
Guest Performers, Results Show: Andrea Bocelli, and cast of Michael Flatley's Lord of the Dance

 |

Ratings

Criticism & controversies

Marc Métral ventriloquism act
In April 2015, following the audition of Marc Métral, several animal rights groups raised complaints that his performance, involving the use of a dog, purported to portraying a form of animal cruelty on television. The routine he used involved his dog wearing a specially designed "ventriloquist mask" – a special device used by ventriloquists on human volunteers, in order to make them into special dummy character for their routines - and was conducted in a similar manner to that of a participant on the seventh series of America's Got Talent in 2012. Métral refuted the claims by stating that he cared deeply for the well-being of his dog, while Simon Cowell refuted the claims a month later, owing to his involvement in dog charities, defending the broadcast of the footage on Twitter by explaining that the audition was allowed to be shown because both himself and the production staff had involved the RSPCA to oversee the welfare of Métral's dog before, during, and after his performance.

Misleading dog act
The ninth series became notable for the controversy surrounding the performance of Jules O'Dwyer, and in particular the routine of her dog tricks act in the final. The nature of the complaint focused on the fact that while O'Dwyer had been clear that her occupation involved training and use multiple dogs for her routines, she hadn't disclosed the fact that she had to use two dogs with similar appearances for the final, as her main dog Matisse was unable to perform a trick involving a tightrope section. When this came to light in an interview the morning after the final on 1 June 2015, Ofcom were forced to launch an investigation after 1,000 complaints were raised by viewers who felt misled by the performance's broadcast. 

Although no formal action was taken by the programme against O'Dwyer and producers, after Cowell launched his own investigation into the incident, an apology had to be issued for the confusion caused by the failure not to disclose this detail as clearly as possible. However, on 17 August, Ofcom found in their investigation that while there had been no intention to deceive viewers, both the production staff and ITV were responsible for allowing Britain's Got Talent to mislead people, and ruled that they had breached broadcasting codes that require television and radio programmes to not be misleading and present facts as accurately as possible.

References

2015 British television seasons
Britain's Got Talent